Cantonalism, mainly prevalent in the late 19th century and early 20th century Spain, is a political option which aims to divide the state into highly autonomous cantons.

It advocates federalism with a radical character (including redistribution of wealth, improvement of the working classes etc.). Its goal is to establish a confederation of towns or cities (cantons) as a federation of independent units. It has a resemblance in some ways to the Greek polis, due to both being systems of individual towns or cities, ruled by citizens, which make up the overall confederacy. Cantonalism was predominantly a phenomenon of the petty bourgeoisie, but also had a great influence on the nascent labor movement, and constituted a precedent for anarchism in Spain.

Spain

In Spain there have been two eras when cantonalism has come to the forefront.

First period

The first of these events took place during the First Spanish Republic, on July 12 of 1873 in Cartagena, when an insurgency took place declaring the Canton of Cartagena. In the following days it spread through many regions including, Valencia, Andalusia (especially Granada), and in the provinces of Salamanca and Ávila, all of them in places that came to articulate cantonalism. It can also be noted, the attempt to establish cantons took place in Extremadura, Coria, Hervás and Plasencia. Pi y Margall, seeing that cantons declared independent by the tardiness of the taxation of improvements, resigned from his post to be succeeded by Nicolás Salmerón who worked to defeat the cantonal movement.

Second period

The second period when this phenomenon took place, despite not being in an ideological manner as above, corresponds to the end of the Second Spanish Republic, which was developed during the Spanish Civil War and the so-called Spanish Revolution, when for five months committees were established. Dozens of municipal and district councils of autonomous power, independent from the state, with their own notes and coins, were established. In some cases, independent municipalities or provinces communicated this decision to the League of Nations.

See also
 Decentralization
 Federalism
 Federal republicanism
 Anarchism

References

Digital copy of El Cantón Extremeño.

External links
 Cartagena-Cantón-1873, a group making a historical reenactment of the canton of Cartagena.

Federalism
Cantons
Cantonalism in Spain